Nnamka Samson Ebukam (born May 9, 1995) is a Nigerian–American football defensive end for the Indianapolis Colts of the National Football League (NFL). He played college football at Eastern Washington and was drafted by the Los Angeles Rams in the fourth round of the 2017 NFL Draft.

Early years
Ebukam  was born in Onitsha, Nigeria, and moved to the United States at the age of nine. He attended and graduated from David Douglas High School in Portland, Oregon, in 2013. While there, he played high school football for the Scots. As a senior, Ebukam played at defensive end, tight end, and fullback, earning First Team All-Mount Hood Conference honors as a defensive end, and also earning honorable mention honors as a tight end.

College career
Coming out of high school, Ebukam received only two Division I scholarship offers. He chose to attend Eastern Washington University over an offer from Portland State.

Ebukam played for Eastern Washington as a three-year starter. Over 38 career collegiate starts, Ebukam produced 188 tackles, 44 tackles for losses, and 24 sacks. As a senior, he tallied 15 tackles for losses and 9.5 sacks, plus three fumble recoveries, two forced fumbles, eight quarterback hits, and an interception.

Professional career
Ebukam was not selected to participate in the 2017 NFL Combine, but he did participate in the NFLPA Collegiate Bowl.

Los Angeles Rams

2017
The Los Angeles Rams selected Ebukam in the fourth round with the 125th overall pick of the 2017 NFL Draft. The Los Angeles Rams traded their fourth-round (141st overall) and sixth-round (197th overall) picks in the 2017 NFL Draft to the New York Jets and received the fourth round pick (125th overall) used to draft Ebukam. Ebukam was the 17th linebacker drafted in 2017.

On June 20, 2017, the Los Angeles Rams signed Ebukam to a four-year, $3.01 million contract that includes a signing bonus of $613,082.

Throughout training camp, Ebukam competed to be a backup outside linebacker against Morgan Fox, Ejuan Price, Cory Littleton, and Carlos Thompson. Head coach Sean McVay named Ebukam a backup outside linebacker to start the regular season, behind Robert Quinn and Connor Barwin.

He made his professional regular season debut in the Los Angeles Rams' season-opener against the Indianapolis Colts and recorded three solo tackles in their 46–9 victory. On November 12, 2017, Ebukam recorded one solo tackle and forced the first fumble of his career during a sack in the Rams' 33–7 win against the Houston Texans. Ebukam made his first career sack on Texans' quarterback Tom Savage for a seven-yard loss and forced a fumble that was recovered by teammate Tyrunn Walker in the third quarter. On December 3, 2017, Ebukam earned his first career start and collected a season-high five solo tackles in a 32–16 win at the Arizona Cardinals in Week 13. He finished his rookie season in 2017 with 31 combined tackles (26 solo), two sacks, and a forced fumble in 16 games and two starts.

The Los Angeles Rams finished the 2017 season first in the NFC West with an 11–5 record and earned a playoff berth. On January 6, 2018, Ebukam appeared in his first career playoff game and made one tackle during the Rams' 26–13 loss against the Atlanta Falcons in the Wild Card Round.

2018
Ebukam entered training camp slated as a starting outside linebacker. Head coach Sean McVay named Ebukam and Matt Longacre the starting outside linebackers to begin the regular season, alongside inside linebackers Mark Barron and Cory Littleton. In Week 11 on Monday Night Football, Ebukam scored two defensive touchdowns off turnovers (one fumble, one interception) and forced another interception in a 54-51 win over the Kansas City Chiefs, earning him NFC Defensive Player of the Week honors. Ebukam finished the season with 40 tackles, one interception, and three forced fumbles. In the Divisional Round against the Dallas Cowboys, he recorded two tackles in a 30-22 win. In the NFC Championship Game against the New Orleans Saints, he recorded three tackles and a forced fumble in a tough 26-23 overtime victory. The Rams made it to Super Bowl LIII where they played the New England Patriots, but lost 3–13. Ebukam recorded four tackles in the Super Bowl.

2019
In 2019, Ebukam played in 16 games, with five starts. He recorded 48 tackles, four and a half sacks, one forced fumble, two fumble recoveries, and 4 passes defensed.

2020
In 2020, Ebukam played in 16 games, starting 14. He tallied 31 tackles, four and a half sacks, one forced fumble, and one pass defensed. Two of those sacks came in the second half of a Week 17 game against the Arizona Cardinals which was critical for both teams, as the winner would clinch a playoff spot. Ebukam's first sack came late in the third quarter and resulted in a loss of one yard. His second sack occurred with just under ten minutes left in the fourth quarter on a second and goal play when he tackled quarterback Kyler Murray eight yards behind the line of scrimmage, helping to force an Arizona field goal attempt. The kick was blocked, keeping the score at 18-7 Rams, which ended up as the final result.

In the Rams wild-card round game against the Seattle Seahawks, with just over seven minutes left in the fourth quarter and Los Angeles leading by ten points, the Rams punted the ball away on a fourth down. However, Ebukam forced returner D. J. Reed to fumble the football, allowing the Rams to keep possession. The Los Angeles offense then scored a touchdown to take a 30-13 lead that proved insurmountable. The Rams went on to lose their next game against the Green Bay Packers, ending their season.

San Francisco 49ers
On March 19, 2021, Ebukam signed a two-year contract with the San Francisco 49ers.

Indianapolis Colts
On March 17, 2023, Ebukam signed a three-year contract with the Indianapolis Colts.

NFL career statistics

Regular season

References

External links

Los Angeles Rams bio
Eastern Washington Eagles bio

1995 births
Living people
American football defensive ends
American football outside linebackers
David Douglas High School alumni
Eastern Washington Eagles football players
Nigerian emigrants to the United States
Nigerian players of American football
Los Angeles Rams players
Players of American football from Portland, Oregon
San Francisco 49ers players
Indianapolis Colts players